Vasyl Albertovych Arkhypenko (Vasiliy Albertovich Arkhipenko; born 28 January 1957 in Mykolaivka, Donetsk Oblast, Ukrainian SSR) was a Soviet athlete who competed mainly in the 400 metre hurdles.

He competed for the USSR in the 1980 Summer Olympics held in Moscow, Soviet Union in the 400 metre hurdles where he won the silver medal.

External links
 
 
 

1957 births
Athletes (track and field) at the 1980 Summer Olympics
Living people
Olympic athletes of the Soviet Union
Olympic silver medalists for the Soviet Union
Ukrainian male hurdlers
Soviet male hurdlers
European Athletics Championships medalists
Medalists at the 1980 Summer Olympics
Olympic silver medalists in athletics (track and field)
Universiade medalists in athletics (track and field)
Universiade silver medalists for the Soviet Union
Medalists at the 1979 Summer Universiade
Sportspeople from Donetsk Oblast